Jean-Michel Charbonnel (born 25 April 1952) is a French long-distance runner. He competed in the marathon at the 1980 Summer Olympics.

References

1952 births
Living people
Athletes (track and field) at the 1980 Summer Olympics
French male long-distance runners
French male marathon runners
Olympic athletes of France
Athletes from Paris
20th-century French people